Megaherpystis melanoneura is a moth of the family Tortricidae. It is found in Japan, Korea, China (Anhui, Fujian, Shandong, Henan, Hubei, Hunan, Guangdong, Guangxi, Sichuan, Guizhou, Shaanxi), Taiwan, Thailand, India and Vietnam.

References

Moths described in 1912
Eucosmini
Moths of Japan